Hungarian-Japanese relations are foreign relations between Hungary and Japan.  After World War II, both countries re-established diplomatic relations in August 1959.  Hungary has an embassy in Tokyo and 2 honorary consulates (in Hamamatsu and Osaka). Japan has an embassy in Budapest.

Both countries are full members of the OECD, World Trade Organization and United Nations.

High-level mutual visits

Head of States 
 April 2000 - President of Hungary Árpád Göncz's official visit
 July 2002 - Emperor of Japan Akihito official visit
 December 2009 - President of Hungary László Sólyom's working visit.

External links 
  Hungarian embassy in Tokyo 
  Japanese Ministry of Foreign Affairs about relations with Hungary
  Japanese embassy in Budapest 
   Gergely Toth: The History of Relations between Meiji Japan and Hungary under the Double Monarchy 1869–1913. (In Hungarian, with Summary in English and a short Abstract in Japanese)

See also  
 Foreign relations of Hungary
 Foreign relations of Japan
 Turanism
 Kazuo Honma
 Ken-Ichiro Kobayashi
 Tony László
 Haruka Orth
 Maurice Benyovszky
 Bernard Jean Bettelheim
 Péter Frankl
 Charles Puffy
 László Müller de Szentgyörgy
 Nándor Wagner
 List of diplomatic missions of Hungary
 List of diplomatic missions in Hungary
 Foreign relations of Austria (Austrian/Austro-Hungarian era, see List of diplomatic missions of Austria-Hungary)
 Meeting Venus 
 Japan–European Union relations

 
Japan
Bilateral relations of Japan